Firekites are an Australian band from Newcastle, New South Wales. The group is composed of Tim McPhee, Ben Howe and Pegs Adams with other members including Jane Tyrrell (The Herd) and Jason Tampake (Josh Pyke), . They released their debut album, The Bowery (produced by Wayne Connolly), in 2008 which has had significant airtime on national broadcaster Triple J. Their chalk-drawn animation (by Lucinda Schreiber) video for "Autumn Story" was nominated for a J Award in 2009.

Discography
The Bowery - Spunk/EMI (URA245) (2008) Closing Forever Sky'' (2014)

References

New South Wales musical groups
Musical groups established in 2008